Muir's Department Store was an American retail store, the largest in the downtown area of Main Street shopping district in the 1920s 
in East Orange, New Jersey.  This store is now defunct.

The R.H. Muir Company (its official name), founded in 1882 was the flagship store of the large East Orange retail district along Main Street.  East Orange was referred to as the first "suburban" retail district in New Jersey and was also home to a large branch of the upscale Fifth Avenue department store, Best & Co..  

A second retail district in East Orange ran along Central Avenue, and this area was home to branches of B. Altman & Company, as well as Franklin Simon.

Muir's was a truly upscale store that featured designer and couture departments for women known as Miss Muir and Lady Muir.  The store featured a large (over ) street floor, and three smaller upper levels that contained home store departments, cc including furniture.  The store was very popular with female shoppers and office workers from the area.

Muir's went through a number of ownership changes in the 1970s, before closing in early 1980s.

The Muir's building was last used as a flea market before the main structure was destroyed in a fire, a couple of adjunct buildings remained, with the Muir label still visible.

References 

1882 establishments in New Jersey
1980s disestablishments in New Jersey
Companies based in Essex County, New Jersey
Companies disestablished in the 1980s
Defunct companies based in New Jersey
Defunct department stores based in New Jersey
East Orange, New Jersey
Retail companies established in 1882